The enzyme trehalose-phosphatase (EC 3.1.3.12) catalyzes the reaction

α,α-trehalose 6-phosphate + H2O  α,α-trehalose + phosphate

This enzyme belongs to the family of hydrolases, specifically those acting on phosphoric monoester bonds.  The systematic name is α,α-trehalose-6-phosphate phosphohydrolase. Other names in common use include trehalose 6-phosphatase, trehalose 6-phosphate phosphatase, and trehalose-6-phosphate phosphohydrolase.  This enzyme participates in starch and sucrose metabolism.

References

 
 

EC 3.1.3
Enzymes of unknown structure